The Wine of Life is a 1924 British silent drama film directed by Arthur Rooke and starring Clive Brook, Juliette Compton and James Carew. The screenplay concerns a newly divorced woman who falls in love with an artist and a hypnotist at the same time.

Cast
 Betty Carter as Lady Branton 
 Clive Brook as Michael Strong 
 James Carew as Alva Cortez 
 Juliette Compton as Regine 
 Gertrude Sterroll as Mrs. Mainwaring 
 Mildred Evelyn as Dorrie Richards 
 Lucien Verne as Brian Westleigh

References

Bibliography
 Low, Rachael. The History of British Film, Volume 4 1918-1929. Routledge, 1997.

External links

1924 films
1924 drama films
British silent feature films
British drama films
Films directed by Arthur Rooke
British black-and-white films
1920s English-language films
1920s British films
Silent drama films
Butcher's Film Service films